is a role-playing video game developed by Nintendo and indieszero and published by Nintendo for the Game Boy Advance. The game was released in Japan on July 5, 2002, and was never released outside Japan.

Development
As seen on the game's box art, the game is billed as an  where the player ventures between the game's "real-life" town and internet. The game was originally planned for the Game Boy Color, but the platform was changed after the release of the Game Boy Advance.

The game's characters were designed by popular manga artist Momoko Sakura. Her sister, Noriko Miura, designed the basis for the game and contributed to its script, while Shigeru Miyamoto, Takashi Tezuka, and Satoru Iwata also contributed to the game's development as producers or advisors.

Gameplay

The player takes the role of a young boy or girl who is on the "carnival committee" of Colortown; a mysterious town where there is no nightfall. The player ventures through the game's overworld in top-down perspective to fulfill two objectives: receive a star from each of the eight guardian gods living in the town to inaugurate the town's festive carnival, and invite as many people as possible to the carnival. The final goal of the game is to invite all 100+ characters of the game to the carnival, but only a portion of the characters can be invited during the first playthrough. Completion of the final goal requires at least three playthroughs of the game.

In preparing for the carnival, the player is faced with various puzzles or mysteries present within the town. The player can meet with local residents directly to receive items useful in solving the puzzles, or access the game's simulated internet using a PDA. Relevant information can be gained through the web pages, emails, forums, chat rooms, and search engines simulated within the game. None of the puzzles and mysteries are difficult to solve, and few puzzles are presented during the first playthrough, allowing the player to get through to the carnival fairly easily. A fair portion of the game is spent as a tutorial, where the player learns the controls from supporting characters, and the game's dialogue and colorful style is directed towards casual gamers and young children.

The game also includes a mode where the player can create their own homepage viewable on the game's internet. The player can design an original homepage by entering text and using preset icons and wallpaper. A homepage designed by Sakura Momoko and her sister is included as an example. This homepage can be exchanged between cartridges via the Game Boy Advance Game Link Cable, and can serve as a communication tool similar to an exchange diary.

World view
Colortown

The game takes place in a town that is divided into nine different smaller towns. Each area is named by color, along with a subtitle describing the region's chief characteristic. There is a guardian god shrine in each area except for Yellowpark. There has been no nightfall in Colortown ever since the magic jewel preserved in Yellowpark's stone circle was stolen by a villain, and the town is constantly awash in daylight.
The Carnival
Colortown's carnival is held upon the arrival of the carnival fairy, and the job of carnival committee members is to awake the guardian gods living in each region of the town and distribute flyers inviting people to the carnival. Each guardian god will wake when certain offerings are made to their shrine, and they decorate their region of the town in preparation for the carnival. There are no adult committee members in the game, and members are chosen by the  carnival fairy.
Monpī
Short for "monster people,"  is the collective name for the mysterious creatures that live in the world of Sakura Momoko no Ukiuki Carnival. A Monpī can be a reincarnation of a human or the soul of an inanimate object that has come to life. They often mix in their own indecipherable language when communicating with the player, and many of them have no interest in maintaining contact with the human world. However, all of the Monpī must be sought out in order to complete the final objective of the game.
MiniP@
 is the product name of the PDA used by the player and other characters in the game. The player's MiniP@ can be used to browse the internet, email, and display the town map, but emails cannot be sent out to other characters. The player can only receive and read emails.

See also
Momoko Sakura

References
Interview with Noriko Miura and Toru Osawa

External links
Official website (Nintendo) 
Official website (Indies Zero) 

2002 video games
Adventure games
Game Boy Advance games
Game Boy Advance-only games
Indieszero games
Japan-exclusive video games
Multiplayer and single-player video games
Nintendo games
Social simulation video games
Video games developed in Japan